Senzo Robert Meyiwa (24 January 1984 – 26 October 2014) was a South African professional footballer who played as a goalkeeper and captain for both Orlando Pirates in the Premier Soccer League, and the South Africa national team. He was shot and killed in a home invasion on 26 October 2014.

Club career

Orlando Pirates
Meyiwa was a goalkeeper of Orlando Pirates from 2005 as reserve goalkeeper to Francis Chansa until 2008. The arrival of new coach Milutin Sredojević at Pirates gave Meyiwa a debut against AmaZulu in a league match won 2–1 by The Bucs at Ellis Park on 8 November 2006. But in 2008 when he was about to show his talent after depture of Francis Chansa to Engen Santos, Pirates brought Moeneeb Josephs from Wits University in 2008 and Meyiwa again had to be goalkeeper from the bench. But in 2012 season the interim coach Augusto Palacios gave Meyiwa some games by swiping him with Josephs, and the new coach of Pirates Roger De Sa gave Meyiwa a chance due to Josephs shoulder injury in 2012 season. Meyiwa showed his talent until he was picked for 2013 Africa Cup of Nations by then Bafana Bafana coach Gordon Igesund. Josephs wanted to leave Pirates in 2013 and he left Pirates to Bidvest Wits after seeing that he has no chance to play. Pirates brought Ghanaian first choice goalkeeper Fatau Dauda in 2013 season but Meyiwa continued to play and Dauda played only 3 games for Pirates and he left to Chippa United in 2014. Meyiwa is known for saving penalties in the Champions League 2013 against TP Mazembe in Lubumbashi, DRC when he saved two awarded penalties against Pirates which were both taken by then TP Mazembe captain Tresor Mputu and Pirates' then captain Lucky Lekgwathi was red carded in that match that which Pirates lost by 1-0 but Pirates won there by aggregate of 3–2, Meyiwa also saved another penalty in group stage match against Al Ahly in Cairo, Egypt that which was taken by Mohamed Aboutrika and Pirates won by 3–0, and Meyiwa also helped Pirates to go to the final against Al Ahly where Pirates were runners-up in the Final. Meyiwa was backed up by Brighton Mhlongo until his final kick of his game life in his final game against Ajax Cape Town F.C. in 2014 Telkom Knockout Quarter-final victory of 4–1 at Orlando Stadium on Saturday 25 October 2014, before his death on 26 October 2014 Sunday.

Meyiwa was made captain of Orlando Pirates by coach Vladimir Vermezovic in his last four games for Pirates before his death after then club captain Lucky Lekgwathi was not playing and he was also made captain of Bafana Bafana by coach Shakes Mashaba in his last four games of 2015 Africa Cup of Nations qualification.

International career
Meyiwa made his debut for South Africa on 2 June 2013 in a 2–0 away victory against Lesotho as substitute of the whole second half to Wayne Sandilands. He was included in the South African squad led by manager Gordon Igesund for the 2013 Africa Cup of Nations, but made no appearances. For the 2015 Africa Cup of Nations qualification, he played four times, with his last match being a 0–0 draw against Congo on 15 October 2014 at Peter Mokaba Stadium in Polokwane.

He was given a captain's armband in all of his last four games that which he played in 2015 Africa Cup of Nations qualification and he joined Brian Baloyi and Moeneeb Josephs by being the only goalkeepers who captained Bafana in four occasions each without conceding a goal during their captaincy, with two draws and two wins each of them. He earned a total of seven international caps with six clean sheets.

Death
On 26 October 2014, Meyiwa was shot and killed in a robbery at his girlfriend's, actress and singer Kelly Khumalo, house in Vosloorus. He was pronounced dead on arrival at the hospital in Johannesburg. Three people were believed to have been involved in the shooting, and police released composite images of two suspects. One suspect, Zamokuhle Mbatha, was arrested on 31 October 2014 and appeared in court, but he was freed on 11 November 2014 due to lack of evidence. Meyiwa's death sparked outrage over the country's high crime and murder rates.

As a mark of respect, the Soweto derby between Orlando Pirates and Kaizer Chiefs, due to be played on 1 November 2014, was postponed. President Jacob Zuma mourned the loss and called for Meyiwa's killers to be found. Former FIFA president Sepp Blatter called Meyiwa's death a "senseless, tragic loss."  Spain goalkeeper Iker Casillas posted a picture on Instagram of Meyiwa holding Casillas' Real Madrid jersey that was exchanged when Spain played South Africa in an international friendly.

He was given a state funeral which took place in Durban, at Moses Mabhida Stadium on 1 November, his funeral was attended by his fans and friends, multitude of football fans, his football club colleagues, football officials and politician dignitaries included Premier Soccer League and Orlando Pirates chairman Dr. Irvin Khoza, Kaizer Chiefs chairman Kaizer Motaung, Mamelodi Sundowns owner Patrice Motsepe, SAFA President Dr. Danny Jordaan, General Bantu Holomisa, Bheki Cele, Former Premiers of KwaZulu-Natal S'bu Ndebele, Dr. Zweli Mkhize who was also the program director of the funeral, Minister of Sport and Recreation Fikile Mbalula, Premier of KwaZulu-Natal Senzo Mchunu, Minister in the Presidency Jeff Radebe who made a eulogy for Meyiwa.
Meyiwa was laid to rest in Chesterville, KwaZulu-Natal. During the funeral at Moses Mabhida Stadium, his father, Samuel, was photographed greeting the crowd in attendance by leaning out his car window with his arms outstretched, which sparked an internet trend.

In October 2020, five men were charged with murdering Meyiwa. The suspects denied that they were involved in the killing.

Senzo: Murder of a Soccer Star, 11 April 2022, Netflix 5-episode documentary series.

Age controversy
In November 2014, it was reported that Meyiwa had apparently lied about his real age throughout his professional career. According to his tombstone and the school register, he was born on 24 January 1984, making him 30 years old, and not 27 at the time of his death.

Honors
Orlando Pirates
Premier Soccer League: 2010–11, 2011–12
Nedbank Cup: 2010–11, 2013–14
MTN 8: 2010, 2011
Telkom Knockout: 2011
CAF Champions League runner-up: 2013

References

External links
 
 

1987 births
2014 deaths
Age controversies
South African soccer players
Association football goalkeepers
Orlando Pirates F.C. players
Sportspeople from Durban
2013 Africa Cup of Nations players
South Africa international soccer players
Deaths by firearm in South Africa
People murdered in South Africa
South African murder victims
Male murder victims
2014 murders in South Africa